Roman Zhuravskyi (3 June 1948 – 19 February 2017) was a Ukrainian professional football player who played as defender.

Playing and coaching career
Zhuravskyi made his professional career in the different football teams of the Ukrainian SSR.

After his retirement he lived in Briukhovychi.

Death
Zhuravskyi died on 19 February 2017 at the age of 68.

Honours
Soviet Top League (1) with FC Dynamo Kyiv: 1971
 Master of Sport of the USSR (1971)

References

External links
Profile at ukr-football.org.ua (Ukr)

1948 births
2017 deaths
Sportspeople from Lviv
Soviet footballers
Ukrainian footballers
FC CSKA Kyiv players
FC Polissya Zhytomyr players
SKA Lviv players
FC Dynamo Kyiv players
FC Karpaty Lviv players
FC Metalist Kharkiv players
FC Spartak Ivano-Frankivsk players
Association football defenders